Joseph Gales Jr. (June 15, 1786 – July 21, 1860) was an American journalist and the ninth mayor of Washington, D.C., from 1827 to 1830. He was the only Mayor born outside the United States or the American colonies.

Early life
Joseph Gales Jr. was born in Eckington, Derbyshire, England.  His father, Joseph Gales Sr. (1760–1841), was a printer in Sheffield, who was compelled to emigrate to America in 1795 because of his republican principles. After living in Philadelphia from 1795 to 1799 where the elder Gales transcribed the debates in Congress and owned the Independent Gazetteer, he moved with his family to Raleigh, North Carolina. Gales, Jr. was educated at the University of North Carolina at Chapel Hill and in 1807 settled in Washington, D.C., where he became the assistant and partner of Samuel Harrison Smith in the publication of the National Intelligencer. In 1810 Gales became sole proprietor of the journal and made it a triweekly publication, and in 1813, having previously formed a partnership with his brother-in-law, William Winston Seaton, the paper was issued daily and so continued until 1867 (after the deaths of both publishers).

Printer
For many years Gales and Seaton were the official printers to Congress, and the files of the National Intelligencer, containing a running account of the debates in both Houses, are one of the most valuable sources of United States congressional history for more than a quarter of a century. Under the title of Annals of Congress, Gales and Seaton published (1834–56, in 42 volumes) the debates in Congress from 1798 to 1824, together with the more important documents and laws, and under the title of Register of Debates in Congress (29 volumes) continued the publication in similar form to cover the years (1824–37). Gales was long the sole reporter on the U.S. Senate.

Newspaper publisher
He began as a reporter for the National Intelligencer in 1807, Reporting the debates in Congress and went on to become the publisher of the newspaper, which appeared three times a week. He made it a daily paper in 1813, originally with a focus on congressional debates. Increasingly it became a political newspaper, spokesman for the opponents of Jackson and supporters of John Quincy Adams, Henry Clay, and the Whig Party. In 1851, the Washington Daily Globe replaced it as the official reporter for Congress, and circulation declined.

Societies

During the 1820s, Gales was a member of the prestigious society, Columbian Institute for the Promotion of Arts and Sciences, who counted among their members former presidents Andrew Jackson and John Quincy Adams and many prominent men of the day, including well-known representatives of the military, government service, medical and other professions.

Mayor of Washington
Gales was elected Washington Alderman in 1814. In 1827 the city council elected him  to fill out the term of the resigning Roger C. Weightman. He was then elected to his own two-year term in 1828. As mayor, he broke ground on the District of Columbia's C&O Canal. He also established relief committees for the poor and dispossessed of Washington.

Later life
In 1830, Gales built a "country mansion" near the old Brentwood Road on 112 acres of land he bought in 1815. He named the estate for his town of birth, Eckington and it became the namesake of Washington, D.C.'s Eckington neighborhood. The house was sold to George Truesdale, who turned it into a hotel and then, following a fire that nearly destroyed it, into a women's college known as Washington College for Young Ladies. By 1922 it became the Mt. Carmel Retreat House for Women run by the Catholic Church.

Gales died on July 21, 1860 and was buried in Congressional Cemetery.

References

Further reading
 Ames, William E. "The National Intelligencer: Washington's Leading Political Newspaper." Records of the Columbia Historical Society (Washington, D.C., 1966): 71-83. in JSTOR
 Ames, William E. A history of the National Intelligencer (University of North Carolina Press, 1972)
 Eaton, Clement. "Winifred and Joseph Gales, Liberals in the Old South." Journal of Southern History 10.4 (1944): 461-474. in JSTOR
 Hunt, Gaillard. "Joseph Gales on the War Manifesto of 1812," American Historical Review (1908) 13#4 pp 303–10 in JSTOR

Mayors of Washington, D.C.
American publishers (people)
American male journalists
Burials at the Congressional Cemetery
1786 births
1860 deaths
People from Eckington, Derbyshire
English emigrants to the United States
19th-century American politicians
19th-century American businesspeople